Diego de la Calzada was a Roman Catholic prelate who served as Auxiliary Bishop of Toledo (1578–1589?).

Biography
On 17 February 1578, Diego de la Calzada was appointed during the papacy of Pope Gregory XIII as Auxiliary Bishop of Toledo and Titular Bishop of Salona. While bishop, he was the principal co-consecrator of Francisco Trujillo García, Bishop of León (1578); Antonio Manrique, Bishop of Calahorra y La Calzada (1587); Antonio Zapata y Cisneros, Bishop of Cádiz (1587); Pedro Portocarrero (bishop), Bishop of Calahorra y La Calzada (1589), and Juan de Zuazola, Bishop of Astorga (1589).

References

External links and additional sources
 (for Chronology of Bishops) 
 (for Chronology of Bishops) 

16th-century Roman Catholic bishops in Spain
Bishops appointed by Pope Gregory XIII